Foppa is a surname. Notable people with the surname include:

Alaíde Foppa, feminist writer
Cristoforo Foppa (1445–c.1527), Italian goldsmith, sculptor, and
die sinker
Vincenzo Foppa, an influential 15th-century Italian painter

See also
The nickname of Peter Forsberg, a Swedish ice hockey player